Jozef Zlatňanský (13 March 1927 – 11 February 2017) was a Catholic bishop.

Born in Czechoslovakia, Zlatňanský was ordained to the priesthood in 1951. In 1997, he was named bishop and the secretary of the Interdicasterial Commission for the Church in Eastern Europe serving from 1997 until 2004.

Notes

1927 births
2017 deaths
20th-century Roman Catholic bishops in Slovakia
21st-century Roman Catholic bishops in Slovakia
People from Zlaté Moravce District